A shipmate is a member on one's own ship.

Shipmate or shipmates may also refer to:

 Shipmate (company), an American order fulfillment company
 Shipmate (magazine), a magazine of the United States Naval Academy Alumni Association
 Shipmates (film), a 1931 film
 Shipmates (TV series), a 2001 American TV series
 Shipmates Forever, a 1935 film